The Weiss School  is a private school for gifted children in Palm Beach Gardens, Florida, United States, founded in 1989 by Elizabeth and Martin Weiss.

Student/School Achievements 
In 2010, A Weiss student was one of 30 finalists named from 1,476 entries of middle-school science fair participants for the inaugural Broadcom MASTERS - short for Math, Applied Science, Technology and Engineering for Rising Stars - national science fair competition.  Science fair ......

In 2014, the Weiss School team finished in first place in Palm Beach County in the MathCounts competition. Its top student earned a place on the Florida team, which finished in ninth place in the national MathCounts competition.

In December 2014, a Weiss School student won the U.S. Kids Holiday Classic Golf Championship that was played on the Fazio course at PGA National Resort in Palm Beach Gardens, which featured 300 junior golfers from around the world.

In 2015, the African Library Project named the Weiss School a 2014 Global Literacy Champion for its hard work and effort in providing for a library at the Letsunyane Primary School in Lesotho.

In 2015, the Miami Dolphins selected a 13-year-old Weiss student to present their first-round NFL draft pick with his jersey after the Weiss student sent the team an electronic resume explaining why the sports organization should hire him.

In 2019, the Weiss School was chosen to represent the United States in the International Space Settlement Competition.

References

External links
 Weiss School Website

Private middle schools in Florida
Private elementary schools in Florida
Educational institutions established in 1989
1989 establishments in Florida